is a Japanese cinematographer, known as DP of Koreeda's Maborosi.

Selected filmography

TV films
 Ultra Seven (ウルトラセブン, 1967)
 Silver Kamen (シルバー仮面, 1971–1972)
 Ultraman Taro (ウルトラマンタロウ, 1973 - 1974)
 Nami no Bon (波の盆, 1983)

Feature films
 Utamaro's World (歌麿 夢と知りせば, 1977)
 Teito Monogatari (帝都物語, 1988)
 Ultra Q The Movie: Legend of the Stars (ウルトラQ ザ・ムービー 星の伝説, 1990)
 Edogawa Rampo monogatari: Yaneura no sanpo sha (屋根裏の散歩者, 1992)
 Maborosi (幻の光, 1995)
 Falling Into the Evening (落下する夕方, 1998)
 Murder on D Street (D坂の殺人事件, 1998)
 Return of Happiness (すずらん, 2000)
 Women in the Mirror (鏡の女たち, 2002)
 Blessing Bell (幸福の鐘, 2002)
 Summer of Ubume (姑獲鳥の夏, 2005)
 Dead Run (疾走, 2005)
 Hard Luck Hero (ハードラックヒーロー, 2005)
 The Harimaya Bridge (The Harimaya Bridge はりまや橋, 2009)

External links
 中堀正夫 - Japanese Movie Database (ja)
 

Japanese cinematographers
Living people
Year of birth missing (living people)